is a Japanese photography magazine that emphasizes the participation of and contests for its readers. Its title alludes to "photo contest".

The magazine has a complex history. Photo Contest (Foto Kontesuto) was a monthly magazine whose first issue was dated September 1956. This turned into the much more ambitious and very different Camera Age (Kamera Jidai), a monthly magazine that ran from January 1966 till January 1967. The earlier magazine returned as the twice-monthly Junkan Foto Kontesuto from May 1967, from January 1968 till October 1973 Gekkan Foto Kontesuto and from January 1974 until December 2007 Japan Photo Contest Monthly (formally , Nihon Foto Kontesuto; normally , Foto Kontesuto).

Notes

Sources
Shirayama Mari. "Major Photography Magazines". In The History of Japanese Photography, ed. Ann Wilkes Tucker, et al. New Haven: Yale University Press, 2003. . Pp. 384 (on Camera Jidai).
 Shirayama Mari. Shashin zasshi no kiseki ("Traces of camera magazines"). Tokyo: JCII Library, 2001. P. 18. 

1956 establishments in Japan
Monthly magazines published in Japan
Photography magazines published in Japan
Magazines established in 1956